The Juno Award for Roots & Traditional Album of the Year – Solo was presented annually at Canada's Juno Awards to honour the best album of the year in the roots and/or traditional music genres. Prior to 1996, a single award was presented for Best Roots & Traditional Album, whose winner could be a solo artist or a band; for the 1996 ceremony, the award was split for the first time into distinct awards, one for solo artists and one for groups.

Beginning with the 2016 ceremony, two new awards categories (Contemporary Roots Album of the Year and Traditional Roots Album of the Year) were introduced to "ensure two genres of music are not competing against each other in the same category".

Winners

Best Roots & Traditional Album - Solo (1996–2002)

Roots & Traditional Album of the Year: Solo (2003–2015)

References

Roots and Traditional - Solo
Folk music awards
Album awards